Notelaea neglecta is a species of flowering plant in the olive family that is endemic to Australia.

Description
The species grows as a shrub to about 2 m in height. The linear, or lance-shaped, leaves are 25–100 mm long and 2–14 mm wide. The inflorescences of 7–9 yellow flowers are 1–2 cm long. The oval fruits are 5–6 mm long and 4–5 mm wide.

Distribution and habitat
The species occurs in eastern New South Wales, from Bungonia Gorge to the Capertee area, where it grows in dry sclerophyll forest on limestone or sandstone substrates.

References

 
neglecta
Flora of New South Wales
Lamiales of Australia
Taxa named by Peter Shaw Green
Plants described in 1968